There are approximatively 100–160 genera and 3,500–4,000 species in the family Rosaceae.

A

Acaena
Acomastylis
Adenostoma
Agrimonia
Alchemilla
Amelanchier
× Amelasorbus
Amygdalophora
Amygdalopsis
Amygdalus
Aphanes
Aria

Argentina
×Ariosorbus
Aronia
Aruncus
Atomostigma

B

Batidaea
Bencomia
Brachycaulos
Brayera

C

Cerapadus
Ceraseidos
Cerasus
Cercocarpus
Chamaebatiaria
Chamaemeles
Chamaerhodos
Chaenomeles
Chamaemespilus
Cliffortia
Coleogyne
Coluria
Comarella 
Comarobatia 
Comaropsis 
Comarum 
Cormus
Cotoneaster
Cowania
+ Crataegomespilus
Crataegus
× Crataemespilus
Cydonia

D

Dalibarda
Dasiphora
Dendriopoterium
Dichotomanthes
Duchesnea
Docynia
Dryadanthe
Dryas

E

Eriobotrya
Eriogynia
Eriolobus
Erythrocoma
Exochorda

F

Fallugia
Farinopsis 
Filipendula
Fragaria

G

Geum
Gillenia

H

Hagenia
Hedlundia
Hesperomeles
Heteromeles
Holodiscus
Horkelia
Horkeliella
Hulthemia (synonym of Rosa)
×Hulthemosa (Hulthemia × Rosa)

I

Ivesia

K

Kageneckia
Kelseya 
Kerria

L

Lachemilla, synonym of Alchemilla
Laurocerasus 
Leucosidea
Lindleya
Luetkea
Lyonothamnus

M

Majovskya
Malacomeles
×Malosorbus
Malus

Marcetella 
Mespilus
Micromeles

N

Nagelia
Neillia
Neviusia
NormeyeraNovoseiversiaNutalliaOOemleriaOncostylus Oreogeum Orthurus OsteomelesPPadellusParageum PentactinaPentaphylloides PeraphyllumPersicaPetrophytumPhotiniaPhysocarpusPolylepisPorteranthusPotaniniaPotentillaPoteridiumPoteriumPourthiaeaPrinsepiaPrunusPseudocydoniaPurshiaPyracanthaPygeum× PyroniaPyrusR×RhaphiobotyraRhaphiolepisRhodotyposRosaRubusSSanguisorbaSarcopoteriumSibbaldia SibbaldiopsisSibiraea Sieversia Sorbaria× Sorbaronia
× Sorbocotoneaster
× SorbopyrusSorbusSpenceriaSpiraeaStephanandraTTaihangiaTetraglochinTorminaliaTrichothalamusTylospermaUUlmariaVVauqueliniaWWaldsteiniaXXerospiraeaZZygalchemilla''

References 

 
Rosaceae
Rosaceae